Santiago Cristóbal Sandoval was an indigenous Mexican sculptor who contributed works to several Mexican cathedrals, including the Puebla Cathedral and the Mexico City Metropolitan Cathedral.

References

Mexican sculptors
Male sculptors